Henry Warren may refer to:

 Henry Clarke Warren (1854–1899), American scholar of Sanskrit and Pali
 Henry E. Warren (1872–1957), American inventor
 Henry L. Warren (1837–1900), Chief Justice of the Territorial Montana Supreme Court
 Henry S. Warren Jr., American engineer and author of the book Hacker's Delight
 Henry Waterman Warren (1838–1919), American politician who served in the state legislatures of Mississippi and Massachusetts
 Henry White Warren (1831–1912), American Methodist Episcopal bishop and author

See also
 Harry Warren (disambiguation)